The following lists events that happened during 2022 in South America.

Incumbents

Argentina 

 President: Alberto Fernández (since 2019)
 Vice President: Cristina Fernández de Kirchner (since 2019)

Argentina claims sovereignty over part of Antarctica, the Islas Malvinas, and South Georgia and the South Sandwich Islands.

Bolivia 

 President: Luis Arce
 Vice President: David Choquehuanca

Brazil 

 President: Jair Bolsonaro (since 2019)
 Vice President: Hamilton Mourão (since 2019)

Chile 

 President: Gabriel Boric (since 2022)
 President of the Senate: Álvaro Elizalde (since 2022)
 President of the Chamber of Deputies: Raúl Soto (since 2022)

Chile includes the Juan Fernández Islands and Easter Island in the Pacific Ocean. It also claims Chilean Antarctic Territory.

Easter Island 
Alcalde: Pedro Edmunds Paoa

Juan Fernández Islands 
Alcalde: Felipe Paredes Vergara

Colombia 

 President: Iván Duque Márquez  (until 7 August), Gustavo Petro (since 7 August)
 Vice President: Marta Lucía Ramírez  (until 7 August), Francia Márquez (since 7 August)

Ecuador 

 President: Guillermo Lasso (since 2021)
 Vice President: Alfredo Borrero (since 2021)

Galápagos Islands 

 Governor – Jorge Torres (since 2008)

Guyana 

 President: Irfaan Ali (since 2020)
 Prime Minister: Mark Phillips (since 2020)

Guayana Esequiba is administered by Guyana but claimed by Venezuela. Tigri Area is disputed with Suriname.

Paraguay 

 President: Mario Abdo Benítez (since 2018)
 Vice President: Hugo Velázquez Moreno (since 2018)

Peru 

 President: 
 Pedro Castillo (until 7 December)
 Dina Boluarte (from 7 December)
 Prime Minister: 
 Mirtha Vásquez (until 1 February)
 Héctor Valer (1 February - 8 February)
 Aníbal Torres (8 February - 26 November)
 Betssy Chávez (26 November - 7 December)
 Pedro Angulo Arana (11 December - 21 December)
 Alberto Otárola (from 21 December)

Suriname 

 President: Chan Santokhi (since 2020)
 Vice President: Ronnie Brunswijk (since 2020)

Tigri Area is disputed with Guyana.

Uruguay 

 President: Luis Lacalle Pou 
 Vice President: Beatriz Argimón

Venezuela 

 President: Nicolás Maduro, disputed by Juan Guaidó
 Vice President: Delcy Rodríguez

Venezuela claims Guayana Esequiba as part of its territory.

British Overseas Territories 

 Monarch: Elizabeth II (until 8 September); Charles III onwards

Falkland Islands 

 Governor: Alison Blake (since 2022)
 Chief Executive: Andy Keeling (since 2021)

The Falkland Islands are also claimed by Argentina, which calls them Islas Malvinas (Malvinas Islands).

Saint Helena, Ascension and Tristan da Cunha 

 Governor of Saint Helena: Nigel Phillips
 Administrator of Ascension: Sean Burns
 Administrators of Tristan da Cunha: Jason Ivory

South Georgia and the South Sandwich Islands 

 Commissioner: Alison Blake (since 2022)

French Guiana 

 President: Emmanuel Macron (since 2017)
 Prime Minister: Élisabeth Borne (since 2022)
 Prefect: Thierry Queffelec

Events 

 13 March –  2022 Colombian parliamentary election
 27 March –  2022 Uruguayan Law of Urgent Consideration referendum
 29 May – 2022 Colombian presidential election
 4 September – 2022 Chilean national plebiscite

Major holidays

January to April 

January 1 – New Year's Day
February 15–16 — Carnival
February 23 – Republic Day, Public holidays in Guyana.
February 25 – Day of Liberation and Innovation, Suriname.
March 24 – Day of Remembrance for Truth and Justice, Public holidays in Argentina.
March 29 – Phagwah, Guyana and Suriname.
April 19 – Landing of the 33 Patriots Day, Public holidays in Uruguay.
April 21 – Tiradentes Day, Public holidays in Brazil.

May to August 

May 1 – Labour Day and International Workers' Day
May 15 – Independence Day, Public holidays in Paraguay.
May 24 – Battle of Pichincha Day, Public holidays in Ecuador.
May 26 – Independence Day, Guyana.
June 10 – Abolition Day, French Guiana.
June 12 – Queen Elizabeth II's Birthday, Commonwealth of Nations.
June 14 – Liberation Day (Falkland Islands).
June 19 – José Gervasio Artigas Birthday, Public holidays in Uruguay.
June 21 – Andean New Year, Public holidays in Bolivia, Chile, and Peru.
June 24 – Battle of Carabobo Day and Feast of John the Baptist, Public holidays in Venezuela.
June 29 – Feast of Saints Peter and Paul.
July 1 – Ketikoti, Emancipation Day in Suriname.
July 5 – Independence Day (Venezuela).
July 9 – Independence Day, Argentina.
July 14 – Fête nationale celebrated in French Guiana.
July 20 – Colombian Declaration of Independence.
July 24 – Simón Bolívar′s Birthday.
July 28–29 — Fiestas Patrias (Peru).
August 2 – Emancipation Day, Guyana.
August 6 – Independence Day, Bolivia,
August 7 – Battle of Boyacá Day, Public holidays in Colombia.
August 9 – Independence Day, Ecuador.
August 25 – Independence Day, Uruguay.
August 30 – Feast of St. Rose of Lima, patroness of Peru.

September to December 

September 7 – Independence Day (Brazil).
September 18–19 — Fiestas Patrias (Chile).
September 29 – Battle of Boquerón Day, Paraguay.
October 8 – Independence of Guayaquil, Ecuador.
October 12 – Feast of Our Lady of Aparecida, patroness of Brazil.
November 2 – Independence of Cuenca.Ecuador.
November 15
Proclamation of the Republic (Brazil).
Independence of Cartagena, Colombia Day.
November 25 – Independence Day, Suriname.
December 25 – Christmas

Sports 

 January 30 – 2020 Copa Libertadores Final.

Deaths

January and February 

 January 21 –  Leonor Oyarzún, 102, family therapist, first lady of Chile (1990–1994)

See also 

2020s
2020s in political history
Mercosur
Organization of American States
Organization of Ibero-American States
Caribbean Community
Union of South American Nations

References 

 
2020s in South America
Years of the 21st century in South America